HMS LST-406 was a United States Navy  that was transferred to the Royal Navy during World War II. As with many of her class, the ship was never named. Instead, she was referred to by her hull designation.

Construction
LST-406 was laid down on 1 September 1942, under Maritime Commission (MARCOM) contract, MC hull 926, by the Bethlehem-Fairfield Shipyard, Baltimore, Maryland; launched 28 October 1942; then transferred to the United Kingdom and commissioned on 26 December 1942.

Service history 

LST-406 saw no active service in the United States Navy. The tank landing ship was decommissioned and returned to United States Navy custody on 11 April 1946. She was struck from the Navy list on 10 June 1947. On 5 December 1947, LST-406 was sold to Bosey, Philippines, for scrapping. However, as late as 1978, she was reported to be in commercial service as Chung 116, flagged for the People's Republic of China.

See also 
 List of United States Navy LSTs

Notes 

Citations

Bibliography 

Online resources

External links

 

Ships built in Baltimore
1942 ships
LST-1-class tank landing ships of the Royal Navy
World War II amphibious warfare vessels of the United Kingdom
S3-M2-K2 ships